Saint-Antonin-du-Var (Sant Antonin in Occitan) is a commune in the Var department in the Provence-Alpes-Côte d'Azur region in southeastern France. In 2012 there were approximately 632 inhabitants.

See also
Communes of the Var department

References

External links
Saint-Antonin du Var, site officiel du village
mairie de Saint antonin

Communes of Var (department)